Jasmin  Eder (born 8 October 1992) is an Austrian women's international footballer. She was a member of the Austria women's national football team from 2011–2013, playing 12 matches. She was part of the team at the 2014 Algarve Cup.  On club level she played for FC Bayern München, BV Cloppenburg and VfL Sindelfingen.

References

External links
 

1992 births
Living people
Austrian women's footballers
Austria women's international footballers
FC Bayern Munich (women) players
Frauen-Bundesliga players
FSK St. Pölten-Spratzern players
Place of birth missing (living people)
Women's association football midfielders
ÖFB-Frauenliga players
UEFA Women's Euro 2022 players
UEFA Women's Euro 2017 players
Footballers from Vienna
Austrian expatriate women's footballers
Austrian expatriate sportspeople in Germany
Expatriate women's footballers in Germany